These are the programs that have been currently aired on 92.3 Radyo5 True FM and its television counterpart One PH.

Current programming

News
 One Balita Ngayon 1
 One Balita Pilipinas 1
 Radyo5 Balita Pilipinas 
 Radyo5 Network News 
 Radyo5 News Update  2

General commentary
 Ted Failon at DJ Chacha sa Radyo5

Talk
 Julius and Tintin: Para sa Pamilyang Pilipino  1
 Sa Totoo Lang 
 Bangon Bayan with Mon 2

Public service
 Alagang Kapatid 
 Pinoy Konek with Danton Remoto 2
 Wanted sa Radyo 
 Sagot Kita 2

Informative
 Chink Positive 1
 Inay Ko Po! 
 Mag-Badyet Tayo 
 Masaganang Buhay 1
 Mind S-Cool TV 1
 Panahon.TV 1

Lifestyle
 At Your Home 
 DiscoverEats 
 From Helen's Kitchen 1

Health
 Healing Galing Sa Radyo5 2

Sports-oriented
 Power and Play 
 MPBL 1

Entertainment
 Cristy FerMinute 3
 Feelings 
 Good Vibes 2
 Sana Lourd 2

Religious
 Divine Word Missionary TV Mass (in cooperation with Divine Word Missionary) 1
 Dr. Love Radio Show 2
 Healing Mass sa Veritas (in cooperation with DZRV Veritas 846) 
 Kamay ni Hesus Healing Mass (in cooperation with Kamay ni Hesus Healing Church)   
 Santuario de San Antonio Anticipated Sunday Mass (In cooperation with Santuario de San Antonio Parish) 
 Sunday Mass at the Manila Cathedral (in cooperation with the Manila Cathedral and Roman Catholic Archdiocese of Manila) 1
 Word of God Network (in cooperation with Christ's Commission Fellowship and MX3) 2

Music
 Sunday by Heart 2
 80s Sabado 2

Programs from TV5
 Frontline Pilipinas  
 Frontline Pilipinas Weekend

Programs from One News
 Celebrity Top 10 
 Woman in Action

Notes
 Programs that are exclusively aired on One PH.
 Programs that are exclusively aired on Radyo5.
 Also aired internationally via Kapatid Channel.
 Hookup/delayed telecast with TV5.

Future programming

News
Frontline Pilipinas Weekend (2023)

Music
 Ritmo Latino Classics

Previously aired programs
 Aksyon (2010–2020)
 Aksyon News Alert (2010–2020)
 Balita Alas-Singko with Maeanne Los Baños, Mon Gualvez and Marlene Alcade (2010–2020)
 Bagong Gawi (2020–2023)
 Alertado with Joey Falcon (2010–2012)
 Andar ng mga Balita (2010–2012)
 Morning Calls (2012–2020)
 Early All Ready (2010–2020)
 Turbo Time with Mike and Lindy (2019–2020)
 Intensity Singko (2010–2014)
 Isyu with Raffy Tulfo and Nina Taduran (2011–2012)
 Hot Seat Sabado (2010–2012)
 Headline Singko (Radyo Singko's first news capsules; 2010)
 One Balita Pilipinas with Cheryl Cosim and Ed Lingao (2019–2020)
 Punto Asintado (2010–2018)
 Reporters On Board (not to be confused with an eponymous radio program aired on DZAR 1026, which NBC formerly owns this from 1987 to 2005) (2010–2012)
 Sakto Kay Paolo, Sakto rin Kay Cherie  (2010–2014)
 Todo Balita (2010–2013; formerly from DZMM)
 Todo Bigay with Shalala (2011–2013)
 Perfect Morning with Mon Gualvez (2011–2019)
 Perfect Morning with Cheryl Cosim (2019–2023)
 Diretsahan with Cheryl Cosim (2010–2012)
 Night Chat (2010–2012)
 Seriously Sabado (2010–2012)
 Kasindak-Sindak (2011–2016; moved to Radyo Pilipinas 738)
 Bitag Live (2012–2017; moved to PTV-4 and Radyo Pilipinas 738)
 Patol: Republika ni Arnelli (2010–2012)
 Healthline (2014–2016)
 Joe d' Mango's Love Notes (2012–2013)
 Manila sa Umaga (2011–2013)
 One Balita (2019–2020)
 One News Now (2020–2021)
 Orly at Laila: All Ready! (2018)
 Orly Mercado: All Ready! (2013–2019)
 Remoto Control (2012–2017)
 Serbisyong Kapatid (2017–2019)
 Tulong Ko, Pasa Mo (2017–2018; moved to DZMM)
 Trabaho Lang! (2012–2016)
 Chillax Radio with Lourd de Veyra (2011–2020)
 Magbago Tayo (2011–2017)
 Aksyon Solusyon with Alex Tinsay (2011–2020)
 Aksyon Sports with Ron delos Reyes (2011–2020)
 Iba 'Yung Pinoy with Maricel Halili (2011–2020)
 I-Sport Lang! (2019–2020)
 Kwentong Kutsara (2019–2020)
 Love Idol with Ariel Villasanta (2011–2020)
 Metro Sabado with Alex Tinsay and Izza Reniva-Cruz (2011–2020)
 Showbiz FM with MJ Marfori (2011–2020)
 Tayo-Tayo (2019–2020)
 Usapang Kapa-ted (2019–2020)
 Relasyon with Dean Mel Sta. Maria and Gladys Lana-Lucas (2010–2020)
 Oplan Asenso with Michele Orosa and Gerard dela Peña (2011–2020)
 Tech Sabado with Jing Garcia and Atty. Melvin Calimag (2015–2020)
 BolJak with Atty. Bruce Rivera, Atty. Jess Falcis and Maeanne Los Baños (2018–2020)
 Pintig sa Radyo5 (2020–2021)
 Slowdown (2010–2021)
 The Huddle with Richard del Rosario (2020)
 Jumpball with Paolo del Rosario, Richard del Rosario, Carlo Pamintuan, Ryan Gregorio, Dominic Uy and Ali Peek, (2020)
 Sportspage with Sev Sarmenta (2020)
 One News Documentaries (2020)
 Idol in Action (2020–2021)
 Raket Science (2020–2022)
 Clinica Flavier (2019–2021)
 POPinoy (2021)
 Public Briefing: #LagingHandaPH  (2020–2021)
 Network Briefing News (2020–2021)
 Simbang Gabi (in cooperation with Holy Family Parish-Kapitolyo) (2021)
 Panata Sa Bayan 2022: The KBP Presidential Candidates Forum (2022)
 Feast TV (in cooperation with Sheperds Voice Radio and Television) (2020–2022)
 22 For 2022 (2022)
 All Politics is Local (2021–2022)
 Probe: The Promise Tracker (2022)
 The Perfect Candidate (2021–2022)
 Optics (2022)
 Bilang Pilipino 2022 (2022)
 Change Makers (2022)
 Ride PH with Jay Taruc (2019; 2020; 2022)
 'Wag Po! (2019–2023)
 MomBiz (2020; 2022)
 All Politics is Local (2021–2022)
 The Dean Mel Show (2020–2022)
 Tech Ka Muna (2020–2022)
 CCF Sunday Service (In cooperation with Christ's Commission Fellowship) (2020–2022)
 Short Take (2021–2022)
 Tuloy Po Kayo (2022)
 TikTalks (2022–2023)
 PBA sa Radyo5 (2014–2023; returned to Radyo Pilipinas 2 918khz)
 The Chasedown Live (2019–2022)
 Ride Radio (2019–2022)
 Sa-Pol Taym (2023)

See also
 DWFM
 One PH

References

Philippine radio programs
TV5 Network